Wu (31 January 1367 – 23 January 1368) was the regnal year used by the Western Wu regime prior to Zhu Yuanzhang's establishment of the Ming dynasty. On New Year's Day of 1364 (Han Song Longfeng 10, Yuan Zhizheng 24), Zhu Yuanzhang proclaimed himself the Prince of Wu (吴王) in Yingtian Prefecture and established the Western Wu regime. He nominally respected the Han Song regime but suspended the Longfeng era name. In December 1366 (Han Song Longfeng 12, Yuan Zhizheng 26), Han Lin'er, emperor of Han Song, was drowned in a shipwreck while crossing the Yangtze River. Zhu Yuanzhang took the next year (1367) as "Wu 1" (吳元年, "the first year of the Wu era" or "the first year of the Prince of Wu's reign" ). On 23 January 1368 (Wu 2, 4th day of the 1st month), Zhu Yuanzhang proclaimed himself emperor in Yingtian Prefecture, establishing the Ming dynasty with the era name "Hongwu".

Later, Zhu Yihai's Jianguo Lu era imitated Zhu Yuanzhang's change of era without era name.

Comparison table

Other regime era names that existed during the same period
 China
 Zhizheng (至正; 1341–1370): Yuan dynasty — era name of Emperor Shun of Yuan
 Kaixi (開熙; 1367–1371): Ming Xia — era name of Ming Sheng (明昇)
 Vietnam
 Đại Trị (大治; 1358–1369):  Trần dynasty — era name of Trần Dụ Tông
Japan
 Shōhei (正平; 1346–1370): Southern Court — era name of Emperor Go-Murakami and Emperor Chōkei
 Jōji (貞治; 1362–1368): Northern Court — era name of Emperor Go-Kōgon

References

Chinese imperial eras